During the 1981–82 English football season, Tottenham Hotspur competed in the Football League First Division.

Season summary
Tottenham enjoyed a hugely successful season. They finished fourth in the First Division, their highest finish in ten years, won a second successive FA Cup (eventually managing to defeat Second Division Queens Park Rangers 1–0 in the replay after a 1–1 draw in the final), reached the final of the League Cup (losing to Liverpool 3–1 in extra time), were joint winners of the Charity Shield (drawing 2–2 with the previous season's champions Aston Villa) and reached the semi-final of the Cup Winners' Cup (losing 2–1 on aggregate to tournament winners Barcelona).

Players

First-team squad
Squad at end of season

Transfers

In
 Ray Clemence - Liverpool, £300,000, August 1981
 Paul Price - Luton Town, £250,000, June 1981

Out
 Don McAllister - Charlton Athletic, August 1981

Results

Charity Shield

First Division

League table 

 6 February: Tottenham Hotspur 6–1 Wolverhampton Wanderers
 20 February: Tottenham Hotspur 2-0 Manchester City

FA Cup

League Cup

Cup Winners' Cup

Statistics

Appearances and goals
{| class="wikitable" style="text-align:center"
|-
! rowspan="2" style="vertical-align:bottom;" | Pos.
! rowspan="2" style="vertical-align:bottom; width:240px" | Name
! colspan="2" style="width:85px;" | Division One
! colspan="2" style="width:85px;" | FA Cup
! colspan="2" style="width:85px;" | EFL Cup
! colspan="2" style="width:85px;" | Charity Shield
! colspan="2" style="width:85px;" | Cup Winners Cup
! colspan="2" style="width:85px;" | Total
|-
! Apps
! Goals
! Apps
! Goals
! Apps
! Goals
! Apps
! Goals
! Apps
! Goals
! Apps
! Goals
|-
| GK
| align="left" |  Milija Aleksic
|| 2 || 0 || 0 || 0 || 0 || 0 || 0 || 0 || 0 || 0 || 2 || 0
|-
| FW
| align="left" |  Steve Archibald
|| 26+1 || 7 || 4+1 || 1 || 5 || 2 || 1 || 0 || 7 || 0 || 43+2 || 10
|-
| MF
| align="left" |  Ossie Ardiles
|| 26 || 3 || 5 || 0 || 8 || 1 || 1 || 0 || 6 || 1 || 46 || 5
|-
| MF
| align="left" |  Garry Brooke
|| 12+4 || 4 || 0+2 || 0 || 0 || 0 || 0 || 0 || 0 || 0+1 || 12+7 || 4
|-
| GK
| align="left" |  Ray Clemence
|| 38 || 0 || 7 || 0 || 8 || 0 || 1 || 0 || 8 || 0 || 62 || 0
|-
| DF
| align="left" |  Pat Corbett
|| 3+1 || 1 || 0 || 0 || 0 || 0 || 0 || 0 || 0 || 0 || 3+1 || 1
|-
| MF
| align="left" |  Ian Crook
|| 3+1 || 0 || 0 || 0 || 0 || 0 || 0 || 0 || 0 || 0 || 3+1 || 0
|-
| FW
| align="left" |  Garth Crooks
|| 27 || 13 || 7 || 3 || 7 || 0 || 0 || 0 || 5 || 2 || 46 || 18
|-
| MF
| align="left" |  Ally Dick
|| 1 || 0 || 0 || 0 || 0 || 0 || 0 || 0 || 0 || 0 || 1 || 0
|-
| FW
| align="left" |  Mark Falco
|| 21 || 5 || 3 || 1 || 4 || 0 || 1 || 2 || 3+2 || 3 || 32+2 || 11
|-
| MF
| align="left" |  Tony Galvin
|| 32 || 3 || 7 || 0 || 8 || 0 || 1 || 0 || 8 || 1 || 56 || 4
|-
| FW
| align="left" |  Terry Gibson
|| 1 || 0 || 0 || 0 || 0 || 0 || 0 || 0 || 0 || 0 || 1 || 0
|-
| MF
| align="left" |  Micky Hazard
|| 26+2 || 5 || 4+1 || 1 || 5+1 || 3 || 0 || 0 || 6 || 1 || 41+4 || 10
|-
| MF
| align="left" |  Glenn Hoddle
|| 34 || 10 || 7 || 3 || 8 || 1 || 1 || 0 || 8 || 1 || 58 || 15
|-
| DF
| align="left" |  Chris Hughton
|| 37 || 2 || 7 || 0 || 8 || 1 || 1 || 0 || 8 || 0 || 61 || 3
|-
| FW
| align="left" |  Chris Jones
|| 3+4 || 0 || 0 || 0 || 0 || 0 || 0 || 0 || 0+1 || 0 || 3+5 || 0
|-
| DF
| align="left" |  John Lacy
|| 7+5 || 0 || 0 || 0 || 0 || 0 || 0 || 0 || 0+1 || 0 || 7+6 || 0
|-
| DF
| align="left" |  Giorgio Mazzon
|| 0 || 0 || 0 || 0 || 0+1 || 0 || 0 || 0 || 0 || 0 || 0+1 || 0
|-
| DF
| align="left" |  Paul Miller
|| 35 || 0 || 6+1 || 0 || 8 || 0 || 1 || 0 || 7 || 1 || 57+1 || 1
|-
| DF
| align="left" |  Gary O'Reilly
|| 4+1 || 0 || 0 || 0 || 0 || 0 || 0 || 0 || 0 || 0 || 4+1 || 0
|-
| GK
| align="left" |  Tony Parks
|| 2 || 0 || 0 || 0 || 0 || 0 || 0 || 0 || 0 || 0 || 2 || 0
|-
| MF
| align="left" |  Steve Perryman
|| 42 || 1 || 7 || 0 || 8 || 0 || 1 || 0 || 8 || 0 || 66 || 1
|-
| DF
| align="left" |  Paul Price
|| 18+3 || 0 || 5 || 0 || 3 || 0 || 0 || 0 || 4 || 0 || 30+3 || 0
|-
| DF
| align="left" |  Graham Roberts
|| 35+2 || 6 || 6 || 0 || 5 || 0 || 1 || 0 || 6+1 || 1 || 53+3 || 7
|-
| DF
| align="left" |  Gordon Smith
|| 1+1 || 0 || 0 || 0 || 0 || 0 || 0 || 0 || 0+1 || 0 || 1+2 || 0
|-
| MF
| align="left" |  Ricardo Villa
|| 26+1 || 8 || 2 || 0 || 3+1 || 0 || 1 || 0 || 4+1 || 1 || 36+3 || 9
|-

Goal scorers

Clean sheets

Notes

References

Tottenham Hotspur F.C. seasons
Tottenham Hotspur